Eiza González Reyna (born 30 January 1990) is a Mexican actress and singer. She gained popularity for her debut role as Lola Valente in the Mexican musical telenovela Lola, érase una vez (2007–2008) and later starred in the lead role of Clara Molina on the Nickelodeon teen drama Sueña conmigo (2010–2011). She is also known for her roles as Santanico Pandemonium in the American horror series From Dusk till Dawn: The Series (2014–2016), as Monica "Darling" Castello in the action crime film Baby Driver (2017), as Nyssiana in the cyberpunk action film Alita: Battle Angel (2019), as KT in Bloodshot (2020), and as paramedic Cam Thompson in Ambulance.

Early life and education
González was born on 30 January 1990 in Mexico City, Mexico, the only daughter of former model Glenda Reyna and Carlos González. Her father died in a motorcycle accident when she was 12; she has cited her father's death as a strong influence in her career. She has one brother who is 12 years her senior.

She attended two private bilingual schools, Edron Academy and the American School Foundation, both located in Mexico City.  She completed two years of a three-year course at Televisa's acting school, Centro de Educación Artística, before she was cast as the protagonist in the 2007 teen-oriented telenovela Lola...Érase una vez at the age of 16.

Career

From 2003 through 2004, González studied acting at the M&M Studio, an acting school in Mexico City run by famed actress, Patricia Reyes Spíndola. At age 14, she was accepted into Televisa's famous acting school, Centro de Educación Artística in Mexico City. While attending school, she was first spotted by producer and director, Pedro Damián, best known for his success with Latin pop band RBD. 

Two years later, Damian cast González in a remake of Argentina's famous children's telenovela, Floricienta. She portrayed Lola Valente, the lead female protagonist in Lola, érase una vez. The show began filming in late 2006, and debuted in Mexico on 26 February 2007. It was later shown in various countries throughout Latin America and the United States. Following the completion of Lola, érase una vez, González, accompanied by her mother, moved to New York City briefly in the spring of 2008 to attend a three-month course of acting classes at the Lee Strasberg Theatre and Film Institute. She returned to Mexico City in early fall of that same year.

In April 2009, she was cast in an episode of the popular crime drama television series Mujeres Asesinas as a supporting character for the second season. She starred alongside Mexican actress Susana González in the episode "Tere, Desconfiada", playing the teenage antagonist, Gaby. González has said that she was told about the casting call while she was preparing to release her first solo album Contracorriente.

In 2010, Nickelodeon announced that González would be starring in teen sitcom Sueña conmigo, where she played the characters of Clara Molina and Roxy Pop. For the role, González traveled to Buenos Aires to film in April 2010. She lived in Buenos Aires for a year, traveling back to Mexico City on breaks during the production of the series. When filming ended in February 2011, Gonzalez returned to Mexico City. The show was produced by Nickelodeon and Televisa, and aired on 20 July 2010 in Latin America and Europe. Because of its success in Argentina, the cast performed several concerts in cities in that country from March to July 2011.

In 2012, González filmed Casi 30, a comedy-drama directed by Alejandro Sugich. González plays Cristina, an 18-year-old ballet student who falls in love with Emilio, the film's lead character. The film marks González's acting debut in cinema. In 2013, the movie premiered at several film festivals in Mexico, but it premiered nationwide in Mexico on 22 August 2014.

In 2012, González starred in the Televisa series Amores verdaderos, a remake of the TV Azteca television series Amor en custodia. The show premiered on 3 September 2012. Originally, Mexican producer Pedro Torres offered González the lead role of Sofía López-Haro in his television show, Gossip Girl: Acapulco, the Mexican remake of the hit American television series, Gossip Girl. González considered accepting the role, but declined, due to her rigorous filming schedule for Amores verdaderos.

In late August 2013, González moved to Los Angeles to pursue her acting career. In September 2013, González was cast in director Adrian Cervantes' film, All Hail the Squash Blossom Queen. The film was slated to star Bonnie Wright of the Harry Potter film franchise, and González was expected to play Brittany in the movie, but she was later dropped from the project when the role was recast in 2015.

In November 2013, González was announced as a cast member for producer Robert Rodriguez's television series, From Dusk till Dawn: The Series. González played Santanico Pandemonium, a role portrayed by Salma Hayek in the original film. The role was González's first English-speaking part, and she also featured prominently in print advertisements for the series. The show was produced by Rodriguez for his El Rey network. González relocated to Austin, Texas, to film the program's first season. Following its U.S. debut, the show became available for streaming internationally on Netflix in the UK, Canada, Australia, Europe and Latin America. On 26 March 2014, the series was renewed for a second season on El Rey. 

On 12 August 2014, she hosted the MTV Millennial Awards at the World Trade Center Mexico City in Mexico City. In March 2015, González and the cast of From Dusk till Dawn: The Series returned to Austin, Texas, to begin filming for the show's second season.

Since 2015, González has landed a string of prominent roles, appearing as Darling in Baby Driver (2017), Madame M in Hobbs & Shaw (2019), Nyssiana in the cyberpunk film Alita: Battle Angel (2019), Fran in I Care a Lot (2020), KT in Bloodshot (2020) alongside Vin Diesel, executive Maia Simmons in Godzilla vs. Kong (2021), and paramedic Cam Thompson opposite Jake Gyllenhaal in Ambulance directed by Michael Bay.

Upcoming projects
González is to appear as "an artist and influencer" in the Apple TV+ climate change-themed anthology series Extrapolations, written and directed by Scott Z. Burns. She was cast in the Netflix series adaptation of The Three-Body Problem from David Benioff and D.B. Weiss., and will star opposite Henry Cavill in The Ministry of Ungentlemanly Warfare directed by Guy Ritchie.

Other projects
González has been a spokesperson for numerous brands. In 2008, González was chosen as the new face of Color Trend for cosmetics brand Avon in Mexico. In 2009, she filmed commercials for the skincare brand Asepxia. She was announced as the newest brand ambassador for the skincare line Neutrogena in February 2015, and filmed advertisements in both Spanish and English to promote the brand.

Following the success of her debut performance in Lola, érase una vez, González signed a deal with EMI Televisa to record her own album as a solo artist in late 2008. Pre-production and recording for González's debut album, Contracorriente, called Counter-current in English, began in fall 2008; the album was recorded in Los Angeles, Texas, and Mexico City. The album was released in Mexico on 24 November 2009. It was released in the US on 26 January 2010. The album's only single, "Mi destino soy yo" was released in Mexico on 20 October 2009. To promote the single, she performed at televised music festivals and concerts across Mexico. Because of the Sueña conmigo musical tour in Argentina, González was unable to embark on a longer tour for the album or release a second single.

In June 2011, González announced that she wished to focus on the production and recording of her second solo album. She also revealed that she planned to spend the remainder of the year working on new music and would not return to film or television projects until the album was completed. She completed production on her second album during the first months of 2012. The album was recorded in Mexico City, Texas and the Dominican Republic.

The first single off her second album, "Te Acordarás de Mí", was released for digital download on iTunes for Mexico on 16 April 2012, and 22 May 2012 for the U.S. The song was co-written by González, singer-songwriter Alejandra Alberti, and Carlos Lara in Mexico City. The album, also titled Te Acordarás de Mí, was released on 12 June 2012 in Mexico in physical and digital format, and digitally on iTunes the U.S. on the same day. The album contains 12 songs, of which González co-wrote three. Te Acordarás de Mí debuted at number 66 on the Mexican Charts. "Invisible" was announced as the second single, and was released on the radio in Mexico on 1 August 2012.

Personal life
As of late August 2013, González was living in Los Angeles. In September 2015, she revealed that she struggled with depression and compulsive overeating from age 15 to age 20 as a result of her father's death.

Filmography

Film

Television

Theatre

Music videos

Discography

Studio albums

EPs

Singles

Awards and nominations 

Universal Awards

Latin Music Italian Awards

TVyNovelas Award

Kids' Choice Awards Mexico

Kids' Choice Awards Argentina

Meus Prêmios Nick

 Fashion Police Awards

Premios Juventud

Lo Nuestro Awards

People en Español Award

Premios Oye!

MTV Millennial Awards

Premios Celebrity E!

References

External links 

 
 Eiza González Official Website

1990 births
Living people
Actresses from Mexico City
Capitol Latin artists
Mexican telenovela actresses
Mexican television actresses
Mexican film actresses
Singers from Mexico City
21st-century Mexican actresses
21st-century Mexican singers
21st-century Mexican women singers
Women in Latin music